Review of International Law and Politics (Turkish: Uluslararası Hukuk ve Politika) is a quarterly peer-reviewed law journal that was established in 2004. It is published by the International Strategic Research Organization.

The journal publishes scholarly articles and book reviews in English, German, and Turkish. It focuses on international law and international relations, but also covers area studies (Balkans, Caucasus, Europe, Central Asia, etc.), international security, sociology, and anthropology in general from all over the world. The journal encourages interdisciplinary studies.

Indexing and abstracting 
The journal is abstracted and indexed in:

References

External links 
 

International relations journals
Law journals
Publications established in 2004
Multilingual journals
Quarterly journals